The men's 400 metre freestyle competition of the swimming events at the 2011 Pan American Games took place on the 15 of October at the Scotiabank Aquatics Center. The defending Pan American Games champion is Matt Patton of the United States.

This race consisted of eight lengths of the pool, with all eight being in the freestyle stroke.

Records
Prior to this competition, the existing world and Pan American Games records were as follows:

Qualification
Each National Olympic Committee (NOC) was able to enter up to two entrants providing they had met the A standard (4:19.9) in the qualifying period (January 1, 2010 to September 4, 2011). NOCs were also permitted to enter one athlete providing they had met the B standard (4:27.7) in the same qualifying period.

Results
All times shown are in minutes.

Heats
The first round was held on October 15.

Final
The final will be held on October 15.

Final B

Final A 
The final was held on October 15.

References

Swimming at the 2011 Pan American Games